A Military Base in Hell (Persian : Paygah-e jahannami) is an Iranian film by the director Akbar Sadeghi. Sadeghi also scripted the film. It was released in 1984, and is an early example of Sacred Defense Cinema, i.e. cinema about the Iran Iraq war. Among others, it starred Faramarz Gharibian, Jamshid Hashempur and Zackaria Hashemi.

References

Iran–Iraq War films
1980s Persian-language films
Iranian war films
1984 films